Gifhorn – Peine is an electoral constituency (German: Wahlkreis) represented in the Bundestag. It elects one member via first-past-the-post voting. Under the current constituency numbering system, it is designated as constituency 45. It is located in eastern Lower Saxony, comprising the Peine district and most of the Gifhorn district.

Gifhorn – Peine was created for the inaugural 1949 federal election. Since 1998, it has been represented by Hubertus Heil of the Social Democratic Party (SPD).

Geography
Gifhorn – Peine is located in eastern Lower Saxony. As of the 2021 federal election, it comprises the district of Peine and the district of Gifhorn with the exception of the Samtgemeinden of Boldecker Land and Brome, as well as the Giebel area.

History
Gifhorn – Peine was created in 1949, then known as Peine – Gifhorn. In the 1965 through 1976 elections, it was named Gifhorn. It acquired its current name in the 1980 election. In the inaugural Bundestag election, it was Lower Saxony constituency 32 in the numbering system. From 1953 through 1961, it was number 54. From 1965 through 1998, it was number 40. In the 2002 and 2005 elections, it was number 45. In the 2009 election, it was number 46. Since the 2013 election, it has been number 45.

Originally, the constituency comprised the Peine district, the independent city of Wolfsburg, and the municipalities of Gifhorn and Meine and the Samtgemeinden of Isenbüttel and Meinersen from the Gifhorn district. From the 1965 through 1972 elections, it comprised the districts of Gifhorn and Peine and the municipality of Uetze from the district of Burgdorf. In the 1976 election, Uetze became part of the district of Landkreis Hannover, though the borders of Gifhorn constituency did not change. In the 1980 through 1998 elections, the constituency comprised the entirety of the Gifhorn and Peine districts. It acquired its current borders in the 2002 election.

Members
The constituency was first held by Joachim Schöne of the Social Democratic Party (SPD), who served from 1949 to 1957. Arthur Enk of the Christian Democratic Union (CDU) won in 1957 and served a single term. Uwe-Jens Nissen of the SPD won the constituency in 1961, but Enk returned in 1965. In 1969, Philipp von Bismarck replaced Enk as CDU candidate and won. Hermann Barche of the SPD was elected in 1972, but served only a single term before von Bismarck returned as representative in 1976. In 1980, the SPD regained the constituency again, this time with candidate Adolf Stockleben. In 1983, Engelbert Nelle of the CDU won, and served until 1998. In 1998, Hubertus Heil of the SPD was elected representative. He was re-elected in 2002, 2005, 2009, 2013, 2017, and 2021.

Election results

2021 election

2017 election

2013 election

2009 election

References

Federal electoral districts in Lower Saxony
1949 establishments in West Germany
Constituencies established in 1949